Relocation is the process of assigning load addresses for position-dependent code and data of a program and adjusting the code and data to reflect the assigned addresses. Prior to the advent of multiprocess systems, and still in many embedded systems, the addresses for objects were absolute starting at a known location, often zero. Since multiprocessing systems dynamically link and switch between programs it became necessary to be able to relocate objects using position-independent code.
A linker usually performs relocation in conjunction with symbol resolution, the process of searching files and libraries to replace symbolic references or names of libraries with actual usable addresses in memory before running a program.

Relocation is typically done by the linker at link time, but it can also be done at load time by a relocating loader, or at run time by the running program itself. Some architectures avoid relocation entirely by deferring address assignment to run time; as, for example, in stack machines with zero address arithmetic or in some segmented architectures where every compilation unit is loaded into a separate segment.

Segmentation 
Object files are segmented into various memory segment types. Example segments include code segment (.text), initialized data segment (.data), uninitialized data segment (.bss), or others.

Relocation table 
The relocation table is a list of pointers created by the translator (a compiler or assembler) and stored in the object or executable file.  Each entry in the table, or "fixup", is a pointer to an absolute address in the object code that must be changed when the loader relocates the program so that it will refer to the correct location. Fixups are designed to support relocation of the program as a complete unit. In some cases, each fixup in the table is itself relative to a base address of zero, so the fixups themselves must be changed as the loader moves through the table.

In some architectures a fixup that crosses certain boundaries (such as a segment boundary) or that is not aligned on a word boundary is illegal and flagged as an error by the linker.

DOS and 16-bit Windows 
Far pointers (32-bit pointers with segment:offset, used to address 20-bit 640 KB memory space available to DOS programs), which point to code or data within a DOS executable (EXE), do not have absolute segments, because the actual address of code/data depends on where the program is loaded in memory and this is not known until the program is loaded.

Instead, segments are relative values in the DOS EXE file. These segments need to be corrected, when the executable has been loaded into memory. The EXE loader uses a relocation table to find the segments which need to be adjusted.

32-bit Windows 
With 32-bit Windows operating systems, it is not mandatory to provide relocation tables for EXE files, since they are the first image loaded into the virtual address space and thus will be loaded at their preferred base address.

For both DLLs and for EXEs which opt into address space layout randomization (ASLR), an exploit mitigation technique introduced with Windows Vista, relocation tables once again become mandatory because of the possibility that the binary may be dynamically moved before being executed, even though they are still the first thing loaded in the virtual address space.

64-bit Windows 
When running native 64-bit binaries on Windows Vista and above, ASLR is mandatory, and thus relocation sections cannot be omitted by the compiler.

Unix-like systems 
The Executable and Linkable Format (ELF) executable format and shared library format used by most Unix-like systems allows several types of relocation to be defined.

Relocation procedure 
The linker reads segment information and relocation tables in the object files and performs relocation by:

 merging all segments of common type into a single segment of that type
 assigning unique run time addresses to each section and each symbol, giving all code (functions) and data (global variables) unique run time addresses 
 referring to the relocation table to modify symbols so that they point to the correct run time addresses.

Example
The following example uses Donald Knuth's MIX architecture and MIXAL assembly language. The principles are the same for any architecture, though the details will change. 

 (A) Program SUBR is compiled to produce object file (B), shown as both machine code and assembler.  The compiler may start the compiled code at an arbitrary location, often location 1 as shown.  Location 13 contains the machine code for the jump instruction to statement ST in location 5. 
 (C) If SUBR is later linked with other code it may be stored at a location other than 1.  In this example the linker places it at location 120.  The address in the jump instruction, which is now at location 133, must be relocated to point to the new location of the code for statement ST, now 125. [1 61 shown in the instruction is the MIX machine code representation of 125].
 (D) When the program is loaded into memory to run it may be loaded at some location other than the one assigned by the linker. This example shows SUBR now at location 300. The address in the jump instruction, now at 313, needs to be relocated again so that it points to the updated location of ST, 305. [4 49 is the MIX machine representation of 305].

See also 
 Linker (computing)
 Library (computing)
 Object file
 Prebinding
 Static library
 Self-relocation
 Position-independent code (PIC)
 Rebasing
 Garbage collection
 Pointer swizzling, a lazy form of pointer modification
 Relocatable Object Module Format

References

Further reading 
 
  (3 pages) (NB. Describes a relocatable hex format by Mostek.)
  (8 pages) (NB. Describes a relocatable hex format by TDL.)
  . Originally presented at:  (609 pages). (This "resize" method, named page boundary relocation, could be applied statically to a CP/M-80 disk image using  in order to maximize the TPA for programs to run. It was also utilized dynamically by the CP/M debugger Dynamic Debugging Tool (DDT) to relocate itself into higher memory. The same approach was independently developed by Bruce H. Van Natta of IMS Associates to produce relocatable PL/M code. As paragraph boundary relocation, another variant of this method was later utilized by dynamically HMA self-relocating TSRs like KEYB, SHARE, and NLSFUNC under DR DOS 6.0 and higher. A much more sophisticated and byte-level granular method based on a somewhat similar approach was independently conceived and implemented by Matthias R. Paul and Axel C. Frinke for their dynamic dead-code elimination to dynamically minimize the runtime footprint of resident drivers and TSRs (like FreeKEYB).)
 
   (33 pages)
   
 
 
 
 
  (2+xiv+270+6 pages)
 
 
  
 
 
  
  

  
  
  
  
  
 

Computer libraries
Assignment operations